The Animal Health Trust (AHT) was a large national independent charity in the United Kingdom, employing over 200 scientists, vets and support workers. Its objectives were to study and to cure diseases in companion animals (horses, dogs and cats), and to advance the teaching and practice of veterinary art and science. It was founded in 1942 by Dr WR Wooldridge CBE, FRCVS, and was awarded a Royal Charter on 29 July 1963. The Queen was the charity's patron from 1959 until the end of 2016,  and the Princess Royal was its president. Based in Newmarket in Suffolk, it was a registered charity under English law and received no government funding. Following fundraising issues exacerbated by the Coronavirus pandemic, the charity was forced to close its doors and enter liquidation on 31 July 2020.

Principal activities
The AHT:
 Develops new knowledge and techniques for the better diagnosis, prevention and cure of disease
 Provides a clinical referral service
 Promotes post-graduation education
 Communicates its findings to others.
The AHT has a range of means of achieving these objectives. It combines them, where appropriate, for best effect. These are grouped under three main headings: Research, Education and Veterinary Services.

Research
Research can be broken into two key areas: inherited disease and infectious disease. Inherited disease research includes genetics, oncology and stem cell. Infectious disease includes bacteriology, virology, immunology and equine epidemiology and disease surveillance.

Education
The AHT is involved in the provision of education and post-graduate training. Its clinics run active internship and residency training programmes. The Continuous Professional Development (CPD) programme has also expanded in recent years.

The AHT publishes papers detailing its research and clinical findings in journals and online, for the veterinary and science professions. It also has its own open-access library. Housing journals, publications, and findings, it is available for use by anyone studying animal health.

Veterinary services
The Animal Health Trust's veterinary clinics provide referral services to small animal and equine veterinary practitioners. It has two clinical centres: the Centre for Small Animal Studies and Centre for Equine Studies. It also offers diagnostic laboratories and DNA testing services.

Both clinics have active clinical research programmes. Together with the diagnostics and DNA testing services, the clinics work closely with their research teams to further scientific developments and achievements. Both clinics are core to fulfilling their educational objectives. Various collaborations both domestic and international have been done with AHT

The above activities are underpinned by the AHT's fundraising and central support teams. Central support incorporates directorate, finance, information technology, human resources and estate and premises management.

History
The AHT was founded in 1946 as the "Veterinary Education Trust" by Walter Reginald Wooldridge; it was renamed the "Animal Health Trust" in 1948. One of its first major donors was Annie Henrietta Yule, co-owner of Hanstead Stud, who offered the Trust the use of her Newmarket stable, Balaton Lodge. The Trust operated from there until 1999.

Following fundraising difficulties and issues aggravated by the Coronavirus pandemic, the Animal Health Trust entered liquidation on 31 July 2020 just after 75 years in existence

References

Further reading
Onslow, Richard (1992). A History of the Animal Health Trust.

External links
Animal Health Trust

Non-profit organisations based in the United Kingdom
Partner institutions of the University of Cambridge
Organizations established in 1942
Pets in the United Kingdom
Veterinary organizations
Charities based in England
1942 establishments in the United Kingdom
Veterinary medicine in the United Kingdom